Hiram Abiff (also Hiram Abif or the Widow's son) is the central character of an allegory presented to all candidates during the third degree in Freemasonry.

Hiram is presented as the chief architect of King Solomon's Temple. He is murdered inside this Temple by three ruffians, after they failed to obtain from him the Master Masons' secrets. The themes of the allegory are the importance of fidelity, and the certainty of death.

The Masonic legend of Hiram Abiff 

The tale of Hiram Abiff as passed down in Masonic Lodges underpins the third degree. It starts with his arrival in Jerusalem, and his appointment by Solomon as chief architect and master of works at the construction of his temple. As the temple is nearing completion, three fellowcraft masons from the workforce ambush him as he leaves the building, demanding the secrets of a master mason. Hiram is challenged by each in turn and, at each refusal to divulge the information, his assailant strikes him with a mason's tool (differing between jurisdictions). He is injured by the first two assailants, and struck dead by the last. 

His murderers hide his body under a pile of rubble, returning at night to move the body outside the city, where they bury it in a shallow grave marked with a sprig of acacia. As the Master is missed the next day, Solomon sends out a group of fellowcraft masons to search for him. The loose acacia is accidentally discovered, and the body exhumed to be given a decent burial. The hiding place of the "three ruffians" is also discovered, and they are brought to justice. Solomon informs his workforce that the secret word of a master mason is now lost. He replaces it with a substitute word. This word is considered a secret by Masons, but for hundreds of years various "revelations" of the word have been made, usually all differing from each other. One such "revelation" is "Mach-benak" or "decay-apparently" based on gestures given and words spoken upon the discovery of Hiram's body. Such is the general legend as related in the Anglo-American jurisdictions.

In Continental Freemasonry, the tale is slightly different: a large number of master masons (not just Hiram) are working on the Temple, and the three ruffians are seeking the passwords and signs that will give them a higher wage. The result is the same, but this time, it is master masons who find the body. The secrets are not lost, but Solomon orders them buried under the Temple, inscribed on Hiram's grave, and the same substitution is made as a mark of respect. The secrets "lost" in the other tradition are here given to new master masons as part of their ritual. In this version, Hiram is often renamed Adoniram.

Hirams in the Bible 

In the Hebrew Bible or Old Testament, there are three separate instances of people named Hiram that were involved in the construction of the temple of Solomon:

 Hiram, King of the realm of Tyre (today, in the modern nation of Lebanon), is credited in 2 Samuel 5:11 and 1 Kings 5:1-10 for having sent building materials and men for the original construction of the Temple in Jerusalem. In the Masonic drama,  "Hiram, King of Tyre" is clearly distinguished from "Hiram Abiff". The former is clearly a king and the latter clearly a master craftsman. They can be confused in other contexts.
In 1 Kings 7:13–14, Hiram is described as the son of a widow from the tribe of Naphtali who was the son of a Tyrian bronze worker, sent for by Solomon to cast the bronze furnishings and ornate decorations for the new temple. From this reference, Freemasons often refer to Hiram (with the added Abiff) as "the widow's son." Hiram cast these bronzes in clay ground in the plain of the Jordan between Succoth and Zarethan/Zeredathah (1 Kings 7:46-47).
 2 Chronicles 2:13-14 relates a formal request from King Solomon of Jerusalem to King Hiram I of Tyre, for workers and for materials to build a new temple. King Hiram (Huram in Chronicles) responds "And now I have sent a skillful man, endowed with understanding, Ḥuram 'abi. (the son of a woman of the daughters of Dan, and his father was a man of Tyre), skilled to work in gold and silver, bronze and iron, stone and wood, purple and blue, fine linen and crimson, and to make any engraving and to accomplish any plan which may be given to him, with your skillful men and with the skillful men of my lord David your father." The phrase italicised above is translated in the New King James Version as "Huram my master craftsman". Most translations of this passage take the "'ab-" in "'abi" as the construct state of 'abba, here translated as master. Older translations preferred to translate "'ab-" as father. The common translation of the -i suffix is "my", giving the problematic reading that Hiram was sending his own father, also called Hiram. This is found in the Vulgate, the Douay–Rheims Bible and in Wycliffe's Bible. The other reading is as the old Hebrew genitive, and some variant of "of my father" is found in the Septuagint, the Bishop's Bible and the Geneva Bible. In his 1723 "Constitutions", James Anderson announced that many problems with this text would be solved by reading "'abi" as the second part of a proper name, which he rendered as "Hiram Abif", agreeing with the translations of Martin Luther and Miles Coverdale's reading of 2 Chronicles 4:16.

Other accounts of a biblical Hiram 

Flavius Josephus in his Antiquities of the Jews (Chapter 8:76) refers to Hiram as τεχνίτης, tekhnítēs, artificer, craftsman. "Now Solomon sent for an artificer out of Tyre, whose name was Hiram: he was by birth of the tribe of Naphtali, on his mother's side (for she was of that tribe); but his father was Ur, of the stock of the Israelites."

The Targum Sheni, an Aramaic commentary on the Book of Esther written sometime between the fall of Rome and the Crusades, credits Hiram with the construction of a miraculous throne for Solomon, which in Esther's time is being used by the descendants of Cyrus the Great.

The most elaborate version of the legend occurs in Gérard de Nerval's 1851 account, Voyage en Orient, where he relates the tale, inserting all the masonic passwords, as part of the story of Balkis, the "Queen of the Morning" and "Soliman", Prince of the Genii. This is an elaboration of the second version above, where the Master Craftsman is named Adoniram. Before his death, he undergoes mystical adventures as his tale is interwoven with that of Solomon and Balkis, the Queen of Sheba. The ruffians who kill him are under the instruction of Solomon himself. De Nerval relates the story as having been told in an Eastern coffee house over a two-week period. A similar account is given in Charles William Heckethorn's The Secret Societies of all Ages and Countries, where Solomon plots to destroy Hiram because of the mutual love between Hiram and the Queen of Sheba. Meanwhile, in 1862, the whole adventure of Adoniram's love for Balkis and his murder by three workmen in the pay of Solomon had been set to music in Charles Gounod's opera, La reine de Saba.

Other theories 
There have been many proposals for the origin of the Masonic Hiram Abiff story, which are dismissed by most Masonic scholars. However the leading theory supported by many scholars of historical Freemasonry is advanced in the recent work of Bro. Christopher Powell, who in 2021 published a paper in QCCC that the Reverend Dr. John Theophilus Desaguliers is the likely author of the Hiram Abiff story in the early 1720s and it was he who introduced it into the 3rd degree. In his research Bro. Powell notes how Desaguliers also introduced the "lost word" aspect of the Royal Arch degree which he likely read in a book he owned titled "The Temple of Solomon, portrayed by Scripture-light." If the word was to be found, it would need to be first lost, hence the Hiram Abiff story. According to Powell, Desaguliers as a Frenchman living in England, would have known the Chanson de Geste legend (explored below), and used it as a base for the legend of Hiram Abiff. However instead of being used as a ritual since the 12th century, Powell argues that Desaguliers used this existing myth to create a central story for the newly created 3rd degree, for which there is no evidence whatsoever before 1720.

Seqenenre Tao II

According to authors Robert Lomas and Christopher Knight, the prototype for Hiram Abiff was the Egyptian king Seqenenre Tao II, who (they claim) died in an almost identical manner. This idea is dismissed by most Masonic scholars.

Dhul-Nun al-Misri
In his book The Sufis, the Afghan scholar Idries Shah suggested that Dhul-Nun al-Misri might have been the origin of the character Hiram Abiff in the masonic Master Mason ritual. The link, he believes, was through the Sufi sect Al-Banna ("The Builders") who built the Jami Al-Aqsa and the Dome of the Rock in Jerusalem. This fraternity could have influenced some early masonic guilds which borrowed heavily from the Oriental architecture in the creation of the Gothic style.

Renaud de Montauban
The French masonic historian Paul Naudon has highlighted the similarity between the death of Hiram and the murder of Renaud de Montauban in the late 12th Century chanson de geste, The Four Sons of Aymon. Renaud, like his prototype Saint Reinold, was killed by a hammer-blow to the head while working as a mason at Cologne Cathedral, and his body hidden by his murderers before being miraculously re-discovered.

Notes

References 
 

 Domenico V. Ripa Montesano, Vademecum di Loggia, Edizione Gran Loggia Phoenix – Roma Italia 2009 

Masonic symbolism
Books of Kings people